CockroachDB is a commercial distributed SQL database management system developed by Cockroach Labs.

History
Cockroach Labs was founded in 2015 by ex-Google employees Spencer Kimball, Peter Mattis, and Ben Darnell. Kimball and Mattis had been key members of the Google File System team, while Darnell was a key member of the Google Reader team. 

While at Google, all three had used Google-owned DBMS’s Bigtable and its successor, Spanner. After leaving Google, they wanted to design and build something similar. Spencer Kimball wrote the first iteration of the design in January 2014, and began the open-source project on GitHub in February 2014, allowing outside access and contributions.

Development on GitHub attracted substantial contributions, which earned the project the Open Source Rookie of the Year award by Black Duck Software.

The co-founders actively supported the project with conferences, networking, meet-ups, and fund-raising financial rounds.

In June 2019, Cockroach Labs announced that CockroachDB would change its license from the free software license Apache License 2.0 to their proprietary license, known as the Business Source License (BSL), which forbids “offer[ing] a commercial version of CockroachDB as a service without buying a license,” while remaining free for community use.

Features 
CockroachDB stores copies of data in multiple locations to deliver speedy access.

It is described as a scalable, consistently-replicated, transactional datastore. A single instance can scale from a single laptop to thousands of servers.

CockroachDB is designed to run in the cloud and has a high fault tolerance. According to popular news outlets, it is described as “almost impossible” to take down.

Even if multiple servers or an entire datacenter went offline, CockroachDB would not stop working.

See also
 Comparison of relational database management systems
 List of tech companies in the New York metropolitan area
 YugabyteDB
 TiDB

References

External links
 

Databases
Distributed computing
NewSQL
Software companies based in New York City
Software companies of the United States